The 2013 Indy Grand Prix of Alabama was the second race of the 2013 IndyCar Series season. The race was run on April 7, 2013 in Birmingham, Alabama, United States at Barber Motorsports Park.

Report

Background
The first race of the 2013 IndyCar Series season in St. Petersburg, saw James Hinchcliffe earn his first career victory, holding off Hélio Castroneves in the closing laps. Expected championship contenders Dario Franchitti, Ryan Hunter-Reay and Will Power all experienced trouble during the race, finishing outside the top 15. A. J. Allmendinger made his return to IndyCar for this race, driving for Penske Racing.

Qualifying
Scott Dixon set a new track record in the first round of qualifying, but it was Ryan Hunter-Reay that would capture the pole in the Firestone Fast 6. While Takuma Sato had originally made the Fast Six, he was penalized for impeding Justin Wilson's qualifying lap, and Tristan Vautier was bumped into the Fast Six after initially missing the cut. Sato would lose his two fastest laps and fall to 12th starting position.

Race

Classification

Starting grid

Race results

Notes
 Points include 1 point for leading at least 1 lap during a race, an additional 2 points for leading the most race laps, and 1 point for Pole Position.

Standings after the race

 Note: Only the top ten positions are included.

References

Grand Prix of Alabama
Honda Indy Grand Prix of Alabama
Honda Indy Grand Prix of Alabama
Honda Indy Grand Prix